François (Frans) Victor Marie Ghislain Schollaert (19 August 1851 – 29 June 1917) was a Belgian Catholic Party politician.

Born in Wilsele, Schollaert trained as a lawyer and practiced in Leuven. He served as head of the Flemish farmer's union, the Boerenbond. He sat in the Belgian Chamber of People's Representatives from 1888 onwards, holding the office of President of the Chamber from 1901 to 1908, and from 1911 until his death.

On Jules de Trooz's sudden death, Schollaert replaced him to become the prime minister of Belgium, also holding the Interior and Agriculture portfolios from 1908 to 1910, and the Arts and Science portfolio from 1910 to 1911.

Honours 
 : Minister of State by Royal Decree.
 : Grand Cross in the Order of the Crown
 : Grand Officier in the Order of Leopold
 : Grand Cross in the Legion of Honour
 : Grand Cross in the Order of Pius IX
 : Grand Cross in the Order of Saint Olav
 : Grand Cross in the Order of the Star of Romania

The Schollaert Channel, discovered in 1898 by the Belgian Antarctic Expedition under Gerlache, was named for him.

External links
 Frans Schollaert at Ars Moriendi  
 Frans Schollaert in ODIS - Online Database for Intermediary Structures 

|-

|-

1851 births
1917 deaths
Belgian Ministers of State
Catholic Party (Belgium) politicians
Politicians from Leuven
Presidents of the Chamber of Representatives (Belgium)
Prime Ministers of Belgium
Interior ministers of Belgium